Cercinium or Kerkineion or Kerkinion (Κερκινέον) was a town in Magnesia, in ancient Thessaly, near the Lake Boebeis.

The site of Cercinium is located at a place called Ano Amygdali.

References

Populated places in ancient Thessaly
Former populated places in Greece
Ancient Magnesia